Greg Walters (born August 12, 1970) is a Canadian former professional ice hockey player who currently serves as the head coach for the Owen Sound Attack of the Ontario Hockey League (OHL). He was drafted into the National Hockey League in 1990, but spent his career playing in the minor leagues. During 12 seasons, he played 248 games in the American Hockey League, and 241 games in the International Hockey League. He later turned to coaching, and has won two Ontario Junior Hockey League Coach of the Year awards, and one Canadian Junior Hockey League Coach of the Year award.

Playing career
Walters played three seasons of junior ice hockey for the Ottawa 67's, after being drafted 65th overall in the 1987 OHL priority draft. In his third season in Ottawa, Walters scored 36 goals, and 90 points, playing for coach Brian Kilrea. Walters was drafted in the 4th round, 80th overall, of the 1990 NHL Entry Draft by the Toronto Maple Leafs. Walters did not reach the National Hockey League, and spent 12 seasons in the minor leagues. He played 248 games in the American Hockey League for the Newmarket Saints, St. John's Maple Leafs, and the Rochester Americans; and 241 games in the International Hockey League for the Fort Wayne Komets, Chicago Wolves, and the Houston Aeros. Walters played for the Brantford Smoke, and won the Colonial Cup in the 1992–93 season. In the 1993–94 season for Brantford, Walters had his best offensive season, scoring 42 goals, and 104 points. Walters was considered a defensive winger, and played for future NHL coaches Bruce Boudreau, Marc Crawford, Ron Low and John Tortorella.

Coaching career
Walters began his coaching career as a player-coach during his final season play, with the Port Huron Border Cats in the 2001–02 UHL season. He spent eight seasons from 2002–03 OHL season to the 2009–10 OHL season, as an assistant coach for the Sarnia Sting. During this time he worked with head coaches Jeff Perry, Shawn Camp, and Dave MacQueen. Walters chose to leave the Sting to return to the Toronto area, and look for a new challenge.

Georgetown Raiders
Walters was the head coach and general manager of the Georgetown Raiders in the Ontario Junior Hockey League for eight seasons, from the 2010–11 season to the 2017–18 season. In his second season with Georgetown, the Raiders won their division and conference titles, and Walters was named the 2011–12 OJHL Coach of the Year. During his third season with the Raiders, Walters was selected by Hockey Canada in cooperation with the Canadian Junior Hockey League, to be the head coach of Canada East for the 2012 World Junior A Challenge, along with assistant coaches Sheldon Keefe and Jason Nobili. His team finished in fourth place in 2012, but in the 2011 World Junior A Challenge as an assistant coach, his team won the silver medal. In the 2016–17 season, Walters led Georgetown to its best season in team history to date, with a record of 45–5–2–2, finishing first overall in the OJHL with 94 points. Walters was named the 2016-17 OJHL Coach of the Year, and the 2016-17 CJHL Coach of the Year. He was also named OJHL Executive of the Year in his role as the team's general manager. During his eight-season tenure with the Raiders, he led the team to a 295–96–16–16 regular season record. While in Georgetown, Walters coached future NHL players Evan Rodrigues, and Scott Wilson.

Oshawa Generals
Walters was named head coach of the Oshawa Generals on June 11, 2018, and assistant coaches Greg Nemisz and Nathan McIver remained with the team. Walters said that his coaching style will be defence-first team, including blocking shots, and a quick counter attack. After two seasons coached, he left the Generals following the cancelled 2020–21 season.

Owen Sound Attack
Walters was named head coach of the Owen Sound Attack on June 30, 2021.

Personal life
Walters was born in Calgary, Alberta, and grew up in the Leaside area of Toronto, Ontario. He resides in the Greater Toronto Area, and has two sons who play youth baseball.

Playing statistics
Career regular season and playoffs statistics.

Coaching record
Note: GP = games played, W = wins, L = losses, T = ties, OTL = overtime losses, GF = goals for, GA = goals against, Ref = reference (source)

Ontario Junior Hockey League

Ontario Hockey League

References

External links

1970 births
Living people
Brantford Smoke players
Canadian expatriate ice hockey players in the United States
Canadian ice hockey coaches
Canadian ice hockey left wingers
Chicago Wolves players
Fort Wayne Komets players
Houston Aeros (1994–2013) players
Ice hockey people from Calgary
Newmarket Saints players
Oshawa Generals coaches
Ottawa 67's players
Owen Sound Attack coaches
Port Huron Border Cats players
Raleigh Icecaps players
Rochester Americans players
Sarnia Sting coaches
St. John's Maple Leafs players
Toronto Maple Leafs draft picks